Doubt is the second album by British alternative rock band Jesus Jones, released in 1991. The album reached number 25 on the US Billboard 200 and topped the UK Albums Chart, and the tracks "Real Real Real", "Right Here, Right Now", "International Bright Young Thing", "Who? Where? Why?" and "Welcome Back Victoria" were released as singles to promote it. The album was issued by Food in the UK and by SBK in the US.

Doubt and "Right Here, Right Now" were nominated for Grammy Awards. The album was certified platinum by the RIAA in November 1991.

Background
According to the album booklet, Doubt was recorded in seven days in May 1990, but "the mixing took a bit longer". Edwards later told the Orlando Sentinel that recording took only six days. While the album had been finished in the spring of 1990, its release was delayed until the beginning of 1991 by Food Records.

There is a message in the booklet which warns people of "possible damage to musical equipment". It reads:

This message is believed to refer to the song "Stripped", which was not played live until their performance at the Woolley Festival in their native Bradford-on-Avon in 2014 because, as they stated on stage at the time, it was "unlistenable". The booklet also gives small descriptions to the songs. For example, "I'm Burning" is subtitled "A re-occurrence of the B-side that was too good syndrome". The booklet also claims Doubt to be inspired by both legal and pirate radio stations in London.

Jesus Jones have said the songs on the album are primarily about hope, optimism, and enjoying everything around you.

Critical reception
The Washington Post wrote that "with singer Mike Edwards layering sing-along refrains over hammering synthetic rhythms and associated racket, Jesus Jones's Doubt (Food/SBK) retains the sass and savvy of last year's Liquidizer". The New York Times wrote that the album "layers on swirls of sound that recall late-1960's psychedelia, especially the Beatles circa 1967-69". Trouser Press wrote: "The optimistic 'Right Here, Right Now', inspired by the fall of Communism in the Soviet Union and other international events, became a deserving pop hit, snaking Edwards’ infectious melody over a subtle but subversive hip-hop beat".

Track listing
All songs written by Mike Edwards, except where noted.
 "Trust Me" – 2:08
 "Who? Where? Why?" – 3:35
 "International Bright Young Thing" – 3:12
 "I'm Burning" – 3:20
 "Right Here, Right Now" – 3:09
 "Nothing to Hold Me" (Mike Edwards, Iain Baker) – 3:21
 "Real Real Real" – 3:08
 "Welcome Back Victoria" – 3:37
 "Are You Satisfied?" – 3:52 (Bonus track; not on all versions)
 "Two and Two" – 2:53
 "Stripped" – 3:51
 "Blissed" – 4:49

Personnel
Mike Edwards – vocals, guitars, keyboards
Jerry De Borg – guitars
Al Doughty – bass
Iain Baker – keyboards, programming
Gen – drums, percussion

Production
Produced by Mike Edwards, except "Right Here, Right Now"; produced by Martyn Phillips & "I'm Burning"; produced by Andy Ross.
Recording engineer for all tracks except "Right Here, Right Now": Clive Goddard.  Recording engineer for "Right Here, Right Now": Martyn Ross.
Mixed by John Fryer, except "International Bright Young Thing" & "Real, Real, Real," mixed (and additional production) by Phil Harding & Ian Curnow & "Right Here, Right Now," mixed by Martyn Ross.

Charts

References

Jesus Jones albums
1991 albums
Concept albums
Grebo (music) albums
Food Records albums